In Albanian and Turkish, Kadri is a masculine given name. In Estonian, Kadri is a feminine given name.  The name entered Latvian as the variant of Kadri, Kadrija.

Notable people who share the given name Kadri include:

Male 
Kadrî of Pergamon, 16th century Turkish linguist
Kadri Pasha (1832–1884), Ottoman politician 
Kadri Gjata (1865–1912), Albanian patriot, writer and educator
Kadri Prishtina (1878-1925), Albanian politician
Kadri Göktulga (1904-1973),  Turkish footballer
Kadri Hazbiu (1922-1983), Albanian politician
Kadri Roshi (1924–2007), Albanian actor
Kadri Aytaç (1931–2003), Turkish footballer
Kadri Gopalnath (1949–2019), Indian saxophonist
Kadri Veseli (born 1967), Kosovar Albanian politician and former Chairman of the Assembly of Kosovo and Kosovo Intelligence Service 
Kadri Kordel, Turkish boxer

Female 
Kadri Hinrikus (born 1970), Estonian children's writer and journalist
Kadri Jäätma (born 1961), Estonian ceramicist, actress and politician
Kadri Kimsen (born 1976), Estonian footballer 
Kadri Kõusaar (born 1980), Estonian writer, film director, translator and television presenter
Kadri-Ann Lass (born 1996), Estonian basketball player
Kadri Lehtla (born 1985), Estonian biathlete
Kadri Lepp (born 1979), Estonian actress and children's writer
Kadri Liik (born 1970), Estonian journalist and political analyst
Kadri Mälk (1958–2023), Estonian artist and jewelry designer
Kadri Ottis (born 1970), Estonian historian and politician
Kadri Põldmaa (born 1970), Estonian mycologist
Kadri Rämmeld (born 1976), Estonian actress 
Kadri Simson (born 1977), Estonian politician
Kadri Viigipuu (born 1982), Estonian track and field athlete
Kadri Voorand (born 1986), Estonian pop singer

Surname
In Arabic, Kadri, sometimes spelt Qadri or Qaderi, and often preceded by "Al-" or "El", is a common Arabic surname.

Notable people who share the given surname Kadri include:
Blel Kadri (born 1986), French road bicycle racer
Ilham Kadri (born 1968), Moroccan business executive
I. M. Kadri (born 1929), Indian architect
Nasrin Kadri (born 1986), birth name Nasreen Qadri, Israeli singer
Nazem Kadri (born 1990), Canadian hockey player of Lebanese descent
Pedro Kadri (born 1995), Brazilian footballer
Sadakat Kadri (born 1964), British lawyer and travel writer
Sibghat Kadri (1937-2021), British lawyer
Shimul Javeri Kadri (born 1962), Indian architect

See also

 Karri (name)
 Qaderi / Qadri (disambiguation), persons with the surname

Notes

Arabic-language surnames
Arabic masculine given names
Albanian masculine given names
Estonian feminine given names
Turkish masculine given names
Uralic personal names
Unisex given names